Shiva Baby is a 2020 film, written and directed by Emma Seligman. It has received many awards and nominations, particularly for Seligman's writing and directing as her feature film debut, and lead actress Rachel Sennott. Seligman was nominated for a Directors Guild Award; casting director Kate Geller won a Casting Society of America award; and the film won the Independent Spirit John Cassavetes Award, in 2022. It also won a National Board of Review Award for 2021, and production designer Cheyenne Ford was selected to the 2021 BAFTA Breakthrough US cohort thanks to her work on the film. Between 2020 and 2022 it won a variety of critics', festival, and media titles; for 2021, and also 2020, it was included on many best-of lists.

As an awards contender, attention was particularly given to Seligman's adapted screenplay and Sennott's breakthrough performance in the lead role, with Seligman as a possible female director nominee also noted. In January 2022, The Guardian wrote that the ensemble cast in general, and Polly Draper and Dianna Agron as supporting actresses in particular, were among the performances that "ought to be in the mix [in the awards season], but haven't yet generated the buzz they deserve." Hungarian film website Hetedik Sor analyzed the whole season's awards performances and named Shiva Baby the "best of the rest".

Variety said that the film would be unlikely to impact the Academy Awards, but felt that it deserved to be considered; The Independent said it should get a Best Picture nomination but would miss out, while Fort Worth Weekly felt it was snubbed for a Best Original Score nomination for Ariel Marx, and Peter Bradshaw of The Guardian thought Sennott should have received a Best Actress nomination. Distributor Utopia initially considered releasing Shiva Baby in time for it to be eligible for the 93rd Academy Awards; they did not and the film was eligible for the 94th Academy Awards. It was one of the few potential nominees that were not made available in the Academy Screening Room.

Discussing the Independent Spirit Awards, Vulture theorized that "the stressful mental space" of the film may be a reason for it receiving fewer major nominations, and described the oversight as "kind of deeply insane". Shiva Baby was the expected winner of the John Cassavetes Award; the ceremony marked a return to fully in-person events following the COVID-19 pandemic and, when the film won, the cast and crew all accepted the award on stage. Interviewed there, Sennott said that "it means so much to [...] feel so supported by [...] the indie filmmaking community". In her acceptance speech, Seligman dedicated the award to members of the cast and crew who had died since it was made.

Best-of lists
Shiva Baby placed on various best-of lists for both 2020, the year of its festival debut, and 2021, when it was released in movie theaters and on streaming. It has been included on overall lists as well as lists specifically for independent, debut, comedy, horror, Jewish, and LGBTQ+ movies.

The climax of the film when "everything gets to be too much for Danielle" was listed as one of the Best Movie Moments of 2021 by Looper.
Rachel Sennott was named on the RogerEbert.com list of 24 Great Performances of 2021, on The A.V. Club favorite film performances of 2021 list, and The Daily Beast 20 Funniest Performances of 2021.
The trailer was listed by Screen Rant, The A.V. Club, and BuzzFeed as one of the best of the year.
The poster, designed by High Council, was listed as one of the best posters of the year by IndieWire, Little White Lies, and The Film Stage.
At the end of 2021, Shiva Baby was included on the TheJournal.ie list of "10 movie gems available to stream now", which featured films released in different years.
In June 2021, Shiva Baby was included on Complex list of the Best Movies of 2021 (So Far).

Notes

Juried awards

Cheyenne Ford was selected to the 2021 British Academy of Film and Television Arts Breakthrough cohort (US) for production design on Shiva Baby.

Critics' awards

In the critics poll of the 2020 TIFF line-up, Shiva Baby placed second for Best Screenplay (behind One Night in Miami).

Film festival awards

Media awards

The film poster was nominated in the "Best Picture (Literal Picture)" category of comedy podcast Las Culturistas culture awards.

Notes

References

Citations

Sources
Audio-visual media

Features

Literature

News

Press releases

Reviews

Web

External links
 

Lists of accolades by film
Accolades